Bernard Mlambo (born 2 December 1985) is a Zimbabwean first-class cricketer who plays for Mountaineers cricket team.

References

External links
 

1985 births
Living people
Zimbabwean cricketers
Mountaineers cricketers
Sportspeople from Harare